Burnt Ash may refer to:

Burnt Ash, Gloucestershire, England
Burnt Ash, London, archaic place name, part of Grove Park, Lewisham in the London Borough of Lewisham, southeast London, United Kingdom.
The A2212 road (Burnt Ash Road, Burnt Ash Hill, Burnt Ash Lane) and the surrounding area in southeast London